Giuseppe Lignano is an Italian-born architect and co-founder (with Ada Tolla) of the architectural design studio LOT-EK. LOT-EK has achieved high visibility for their sustainable and innovative approach to construction, materials, and space and through the adaptive reuse (“upcycling”) of existing industrial objects and systems not originally intended for architecture.

Giuseppe has a degree in Architecture and Urban Design from the Universita’ di Napoli, Italy, and completed postgraduate studies at Columbia University, in New York City. Besides heading his professional practice at LOT-EK, he currently teaches at Columbia University’s Graduate School of Architecture, Planning and Preservation. He also lectures at other universities and cultural institutions globally.

In December 2011, Giuseppe was recognized as a United States Artists (USA) Booth Fellow of Architecture and Design. Nominations are made each year by arts leaders and practitioners, critics, and scholars, of artists they believe show an extraordinary commitment to their craft.

LOT-EK has completed numerous residential, commercial and institutional projects in the US and abroad, as well as exhibition design and site-specific installations for major cultural institutions and museums, including MoMA, the Whitney Museum and the Guggenheim. Its projects are regularly published in international publications, magazines and books, such as The New York Times, The Times, Herald Tribune, The Wall Street Journal, Domus, Mark Magazine, Wired, Dwell, Metropolis, Vogue, and others.

LOT-EK, Objects and Operations, the studio's new monograph, was released by The Monacelli Press in August 2017. Its first monograph, Urbanscan, was published by PAP in February 2002. LOT-EK Mixer, by Edizioni Press, was issued in 2000, and MDU Mobile Dwelling Unit, published by DAP, was printed in June 2003.

References

1963 births
Living people